Simon Brown (born 1956 in Sydney, New South Wales), is an Australian science fiction writer.

He originally trained as a journalist and worked for a range of Australian Government Departments, including the Australian Electoral Commission and the NSW Railways Department.  He wrote science fiction short stories for many years and some of these have been collected in Cannibals in the Fine Light (1998). A second collection of Iliad-themed stories, Troy, was published in 2006.  He is a member of the Australian Skeptics and edited Skeptical – A handbook of pseudoscience and the paranormal in 1989.  He was also an editor of Argos, the journal of the Canberra Skeptics.

He won the 2009 short story division of the Aurealis Award for his story "The Empire"

Publications

Novels
 Privateer, HarperCollins Australia 1996
 Winter, HarperCollins Australia 1997
 Inheritance: Book 1 of the Keys of Power, HarperCollins Australia, 2000
 Fire and Sword: Book 2 of the Keys of Power, HarperCollins Australia, 2001
 Sovereign: Book 3 of the Keys of Power, HarperCollins Australia, 2002
 Empire's Daughter: Book 1 of the Chronicles of Kydan, Pan MacMillan Australia, 2004
 Rival's Son: Book 2 of the Chronicles of Kydan, Pan MacMillan Australia, 2004
 Daughter of Independence: Book 3 of the Chronicles of Kydan, Pan MacMillan Australia, 2005

Collections
 Cannibals of the Fine Light, Ticonderoga Publications, April 1998
 Troy, Ticonderoga Publications, 2006

Selected short fiction
"With Clouds at Our Feet" (1998) in Dreaming Down-Under (ed. Jack Dann, Janeen Webb)
"Water Babies (novelette)|Water Babies" (2004) in Agog! Smashing Stories (ed. Cat Sparks)
"Leviathan (short story)|Leviathan" (2006) in Fantasy: The Very Best of 2005 (ed. Jonathan Strahan)

Other works
 Skeptical – A Handbook of pseudoscience and the paranormal, Ed Donald Laycock, David Vernon, Colin Groves, Simon Brown, Imagecraft, Canberra, 1989.

Awards
"Atrax" (with Sean Williams) Aurealis Award for Horror Short Fiction, 1999
"Love is a Stone", Aurealis Award for Horror Short Fiction, 2003
"The Empire" Aurealis Award for Science Fiction Short Fiction, 2008

External links
 Simon Brown's Home Page
 Review of Troy

References

1956 births
Living people
Australian fantasy writers
Australian science fiction writers
Writers from Sydney